The 1987 Akron Zips football team represented Akron University in the 1987 NCAA Division I-A football season as Division I-A independents. They were led by second-year head coach Gerry Faust. The Zips played their home games at the Rubber Bowl in Akron, Ohio. They finished the season with a record of 4–7.

Schedule

References

Akron
Akron Zips football seasons
Akron Zips football